Greenlaw railway station served the town of Greenlaw, Scottish Borders, Scotland from 1863 to 1948 on the Berwickshire Railway.

History 
The station opened on 16 November 1863 by the Berwickshire Railway. The station was situated immediately east of a new road which now bypasses the building and the road overbridge which also survives. The station closed to passengers on 13 August 1948 but goods traffic continued until 1965. The station building survives and is a private residence. The platform has been landscaped as a garden.

References

External links 

Disused railway stations in the Scottish Borders
Former North British Railway stations
Railway stations in Great Britain opened in 1863
Railway stations in Great Britain closed in 1948
1863 establishments in Scotland
1948 disestablishments in Scotland